Thomas Lloyd (17 November 1903 – 20 January 1984) was an English professional footballer who played as a full-back for Sunderland.

References

1903 births
1984 deaths
Sportspeople from Wednesbury
English footballers
Association football fullbacks
Walsall F.C. players
Willenhall F.C. players
Sunderland A.F.C. players
Bradford (Park Avenue) A.F.C. players
Burton Town F.C. players
English Football League players